Margaret Anderson may refer to:

People  
Margaret Anderson Watts (1832–1905), American social reformer in the temperance movement, writer, and clubwoman
Margaret Anderson (museum creator) (1834–1910), Scottish museum founder
Margaret J. Anderson (1859–1930), American hotel owner, businesswoman, and socialite
Margaret C. Anderson (1886–1973), American editor and publisher
Margaret Thorn (née Anderson, 1897–1969), New Zealand bookkeeper, political activist and welfare worker
Margaret Anderson (indexer) (1900–1997), British biochemist and indexer
Betty Harvie Anderson, Baroness Skrimshire of Quarter (Margaret Betty Harvie Anderson, 1913–1979), British politician
Margaret Jean Anderson (1915–2003), Canadian businesswoman
Peggy Anderson (author) (Margaret Joan Anderson, 1938–2016), American reporter and author
Margaret L. Anderson (born 1941), American professor
Margaret Dawn Anderson (born 1967), Canadian civil servant and politician
Margaret Anderson Kelliher (born 1968), American politician
Margaret A. Anderson, executive director of FasterCures

Other  
, a U.S. Navy patrol boat during World War I
Margaret Anderson, a character in Father Knows Best

See also
Maggie Anderson (disambiguation)

Anderson, Margaret